Dhag (meaning Blaze) is an Indian Marathi film directed by Shivaji Lotan Patil. The story of the film is of a young boy wanting to break the successions of traditional jobs in his low caste family. The film was released on 7 March 2014, by DAR Film Distributors. Initial Public Relation activity was done by Ram Kondilkar then its marketing and PR for the film was done by Newsmax Multimedia Pvt. Ltd. The film was released in national and international film festivals.

The film has won in total of 47 awards which includes 3 awards at the 60th National Film Awards : Best Director, Best Actress for Usha Jadhav and a Special Jury mention for performance by a child actor for Hansraj Jagtap.

Plot
Dhag is the story of Krishna, his mother and their seemingly ambitious aspirations for Krishna, against the backdrop of their socio-economic standing.

Raised by a father who cremated people for a living, Krishna’s mother always wanted him to pave a path for himself that takes him away from the sorrows and hardship of his legacy. While his father’s untimely death opens the gates of opportunity for young Krishna, the plight of his widowed helpless mother reels him back to his origins. Dhag captures the moments, trials and tribulations of young Krishna along the journey.

Cast
 Usha Jadhav as Yashoda, Krishna's mother
 Hansraj Jagtap as Krishna
 Upendra Limaye as Shripati, Krishna's father
 Nagesh Bhosale
 Suhasini Deshpande 
 Neha Dakhinkar

Awards
 National Film Awards - 60th National Film Awards
 Best Director - Shivaji Lotan Patil
 Best Actress - Usha Jadhav
 Special Jury mention - Hansraj Jagtap
 Maharashtra Times Sanmaan Awards
 Best Director (film) - Shivaji Lotan Patil
 Best Actress (film) - Usha Jadhav
 Best Supporting Actor (film) - Upendra Limaye
 Best Child Actor (film) - Hansraj Jagtap
 Best Screenplay - Nitin Dixit

References

2012 films
Films featuring a Best Actress National Award-winning performance
Films whose director won the Best Director National Film Award
2010s Marathi-language films